Patriot Rail Company LLC (Patriot Rail) is a holding company for a number of shortline railroads across the United States.

In June 2012, Patriot Rail was acquired by SteelRiver Infrastructure Partners (SteelRiver).

On August 8, 2022 Patriot Rail announced its intention to acquire Pioneer Lines.

Holdings
Active railroad operations.
Kingman Terminal Railroad
Tennessee Southern Railroad
Butte, Anaconda and Pacific Railway
Utah Central Railway
Salt Lake, Garfield & Western Railway
Sacramento Valley Railroad
Louisiana and North West Railroad
Temple and Central Texas Railway
DeQueen and Eastern Railroad/Texas, Oklahoma and Eastern Railroad
Golden Triangle Railroad
Columbia and Cowlitz Railway/Patriot Woods Railroad
West Belt Railway
Georgia Northeastern Railroad

Former holdings
 Mississippi and Skuna Valley Railroad.  This line was acquired from Weyerhaeuser in 2010, but due to issues about a damaged bridge on a connecting railroad, Patriot filed for abandonment in 2011, and the line has since become a rail-to-trail conversion.

References

External links
http://www.patriotrail.com/

 
United States railroad holding companies
Companies based in Jacksonville, Florida